Thomas Cheesman (1760–1834) was a British engraver who worked in London. He was a student of 
the Italian engraver Francesco Bartolozzi, who was working in London at the time.

Works
In 1796, John Trumbull, who had brought a small version of his painting, General George Washington at Trenton, to London in 1794, supervised Cheesman in the engraving George Washington. It was noted by historian Justin Winsor as the best engraving of Trumbull's paintings and was used as the basis for several other engravings.

References

External links 

 

1760 births
1834 deaths
British engravers
Artists from London